Buecker may refer to:

Bradley Buecker, American television and film director, producer
Bücker (disambiguation)

See also
Bueckers, surname